The Northern Regional Football League Conference, currently known as  Lotto Sport Italia NRFL Conference for sponsorship reasons, is a New Zealand amateur football league. The league is run by the Auckland Football Federation and includes football clubs located in the northern part of the North Island, New Zealand. It is open to clubs from the Northland, Auckland, Waikato and Bay of Plenty provinces. Up until 2022, the competition was known as NRFL Division 2, and was not split into Northern and Southern competitions.

The fixtures are played generally from April to September. Clubs are able to win promotion to NRFL Championship.

The current champions as of the 2022 season are Hibiscus Coast. They were promoted alongside Ngaruawahia United for the 2023 NRFL Championship season.

Current Northern League structure
 Northern League 
 NRFL Championship 
 NRFL Conference (this page)
 NRF League One, WaiBOP League One

Current clubs

Northern Conference

As of the 2023 season.

Southern Conference
As of the 2023 season.

Past champions
Source:

1965 – Lynndale
1966 – Kahukura
1967 – Ellerslie
1968 – Huntly Thistle
1969 – Takapuna City
1970 – Massey Rovers
1971 – Metro College
1972 – Papakura City
1973 – Manurewa
1974 – Whangarei City
1975 – Lynndale
1976 – Glenfield Rovers
1977 – Ellerslie
1978 – East Coast Bays
1979 – Waitemata City
1980 – Birkenhead United
1981 – Eden
1982 – University
1983 – Otara Rangers
1984 – Mount Manganui
1985 – Claudelands Rovers
1986 – Rotorua Suburbs
1987 – Glenfield Rovers
1988 – Onehunga Sports
1989 – Kawerau Town
1990 – Eden
1991 – Hamilton Wanderers
1992 – Onehunga Sports
1993 – Cambridge
1994 – Western Springs
1995 – Mount Roskill
1996 – Otahuhu United
1997 – Tauranga City
1998 – Western Springs
1999 – Taupo
2000 – Mount Albert-Ponsonby
2001 – Tauranga City United
2002 – Mangere United
2003 – Eastern Suburbs
2004 – North Force
2005 – South Auckland Rangers
2006 – Papatoetoe
2007 – Fencibles United
2008–2009 – no competition
2010 – Mangere United
2011 – Mount Albert-Ponsonby
2012 – Hibiscus Coast
2013 – Western Springs
2014 – Tauranga City United
2015 – Papakura City
2016 – Manukau City
2017 – Fencibles United
2018 – Takapuna
2019 – Albany United
2020 – Abandoned due to COVID-19 pandemic in New Zealand
2021 – Onehunga-Mangere United
2022 – Hibiscus Coast

Notes

References

External links
Lotto NZRFL website
Auckland Football Federation
Northern League Second Division 2018 Board
Sports Web Soccer

3
NRFL Conference
4
Sports leagues established in 1965
1965 establishments in New Zealand